The 2011–12 Midland Football Alliance season was the 18th in the history of Midland Football Alliance, a football competition in England.

Clubs and League table
The league featured 18 clubs from the previous season, along with four new clubs:
Atherstone Town, resigned from the Southern Football League
Gresley, promoted from the East Midlands Counties League
Heather St John's, promoted from the Midland Football Combination 
Tividale, promoted from the West Midlands (Regional) League

League Table

References

External links
 Midland Football Alliance

2011–12
9